Cooper Taylor (born April 4, 1990) is a former American football safety. He played college football at Georgia Tech before transferring to Richmond. He was selected in the fifth round by the New York Giants of the 2013 NFL Draft.

Early years
Taylor attended Marist High School in Atlanta, Georgia. He was a wwo-time all-state and all-county selection and also earned three varsity letters in football in high school.

College career

Georgia Tech
He played college football at Georgia Tech from 2008-2010. He was selected for the second-team All-ACC by Rivals and was an honorable mention Freshmen All-America by College Football News in the 2008 season.

Richmond
After being diagnosed with Wolff-Parkinson-White Syndrome, Taylor missed most of the 2009 and 2010 seasons with Georgia Tech and transferred. He spent his final two seasons at the University of Richmond. He was impressive during his time with the Spiders. In his senior season he was a selected for the First-team AP All-American, First-team Walter Camp All-America, First-team The Sports Network All-American, Second-team All-American by Phil Steele and the Second-team All-American by Beyond College Sports First-team All-CAA, the First-team VaSID All-State, College Sports Madness First-team All-CAA, the First-team Capital One Academic All-American and was the selection of the CoSIDA Academic All-District. He also was selected for The Touchdown Club of Richmond Division I National Defensive Back of the Year. Following the conclusion of his senior season, Taylor was selected to and participated in the 2013 East-West Shrine Game as a member on the East team. On February 19, 2013, he was selected as the CAA Football Scholar Athlete Of The Year.

Professional career

Before the draft, Taylor impressed scouts during his performance in the East-West Shrine Game. His large frame (6'5", 228 pounds) and athleticism drew many comparisons to Seattle Seahawks safety Kam Chancellor. Taylor was eventually selected in the 5th round (152 overall) in the 2013 NFL Draft by the New York Giants. On October 20, 2015, he was waived by the Giants. On November 4, 2015, he was signed to the practice squad. On November 18, 2015, Taylor was promoted to the active roster. On August 30, 2016, he was waived by the Giants.

Personal life
Taylor is the son of former Georgia Tech quarterback Jim Bob Taylor who was drafted in the 11th round in the 1983 NFL Draft by the Baltimore Colts, where he spent his only NFL season in 1983.

References

External links

Georgia Tech Yellow Jackets bio
Richmond Spiders bio

1990 births
Living people
Richmond Spiders football players
American football safeties
New York Giants players
Players of American football from Atlanta